Share Bazaar is a 1997 Bollywood film, directed by Manmohan and released in 1997.

Synopsis
In Bombay's business district, on Dalal Street, stands a multi-storied building called the "Bombay Stock Exchange" or the Share Bazaar. This is where fortunes are made and lost. Two of such traders in shares are the Mehta brothers, Hasmukh and Mansukh. They also manipulate people's lives, and this time they have chosen to financially ruin Shekar, by getting him arrested on trumped-up charges. And on the other hand, they have singled out a street-smart young man by the Raj, and get him to take Shekar's place.

Cast 
 Jackie Shroff as Jai
 Ravi Kishan as Shekar
 Anupam Kher
 Dimple Kapadia
 Tinnu Anand
 C.S. Dubey as Money lender
 Jankidas
 Sudhir as Police Commissioner

Soundtrack
The Music was Composed By Utpal Biswas and Released by Sony Music India.

References

External links

1997 films
1990s Hindi-language films